These are the records of the National Youth Competition which is a rugby league competition in Australia, beginning in 2008.

Biggest Wins

Highest Scoring Matches

Lowest Scoring Matches

Winning Streaks

Losing Streaks

New Zealand Warriors have been involved in 2 consecutive drawn matches. The first match was a 26–26 draw against the Bulldogs in round 5 on 13 April 2008 at Mt Smart Stadium, Auckland, and this was followed with a 24–24 draw against the North Queensland Cowboys in round 6 on 19 April 2008 at Dairy Farmers Stadium, Townsville.

Biggest Comeback

 28 points by Brisbane Broncos. Trailed 28–0 at halftime to win 34–32 against the South Sydney Rabbitohs on 22 June 2012 at Suncorp Stadium.
 28 points by Cronulla-Sutherland Sharks. Trailed 34–6 at half time against the Melbourne Storm before winning 48–40 at Southern Cross Group Stadium in round 4, 2016.

Biggest finals comeback 

 22 points when the Sydney Roosters trailed the Penrith Panthers 28–6 at halftime in the 2016 Grand Final, before winning 30–28.

See also

State of Origin results and statistics
List of NRL records

References

External links

List of records
Under-20s records
NRL Under-20s records
NRL Under-20s records